Painkiller: Overdose is a stand-alone expansion pack for the first-person shooter video game Painkiller, developed by Mindware Studios. Mindware originally intended it to be fan-made mod but the publisher DreamCatcher Interactive granted the project full financial and technical support, and officially published it in 2007. The expansion offers 40 types of monsters, 16 additional levels, and six additional weapons. It is the second expansion of Painkiller with the first being Battle Out of Hell.

Plot
The player takes the role of Belial, a half-angel, half-demon gatekeeper and son of angel Samael. He was rejected by both hell and heaven, and as a result, Sammael and Cerberus imprisoned him. When Daniel Garner defeats Lucifer in Painkiller, Belial escapes his prison and starts to seek revenge.

Reception
Painkiller: Overdose received mixed reviews from critics. Reviews of Overdose were more positive than reviews of other expansions (with the exception of Battle out of Hell). It was criticised for lack of innovation and slow loads but praised for gameplay that is the same as in original game.

Sequels
Belial, the playable protagonist of Overdose, reappeared in all later expansions and sequels. In Painkiller: Redemption Belial was one of two playable characters. Redemption was developed by Eggtooth Team and released in 2011. Belial also briefly appeared in Painkiller: Hell & Damnation which serves as a remake and sequel to original Painkiller.

References

2007 video games
Dark fantasy video games
Video games about angels
Video games about demons
First-person shooters
Video games based on the Bible
Video games developed in the Czech Republic
Video game expansion packs
Video games about witchcraft
Windows-only games
Windows games
Video games using Havok
JoWooD Entertainment games